Drovers Run is a fictional cattle station in the South Australian outback in the Australian hit drama show McLeod's Daughters.  The fictitious cattle station is named generically after a drover and has been in the McLeod family for generations.  For generations it was passed on from father to son, but was passed on to the two daughters of Jack McLeod. Drovers Run was located 50 km from its neighbouring farm, Killarney (season 7 episode 2), where the Ryan family lives.

Storyline
Hardship and respect for the land are the key values at Drovers Run, a vast cattle and farming property in the Australian outback that once belonged to Jack McLeod. After his death, his two daughters, Claire and Tess McLeod, reunite to decide the property’s future. Later, after Claire's shock death, Tess McLeod and Stevie Hall (Claire’s best friend) run Drovers with workers Meg (Rivers-)Fountain, Jodi Fountain (Meg’s daughter), and Kate Manfredi (best friends with Jodi). Tess goes on to marry Nick Ryan and Jodi later discovers she is Tess’ sister.  Tess gives half of Drovers Run to Jodi, before moving to Argentina with husband Nick and giving birth to daughter Ruth Claire. Jodi Fountain-McLeod continues running Drovers, along with cousin Regan McLeod, new part owner Stevie, and farm-hands Kate and Moira. When Jodi departs with Matt Bosnich into Witness Protection, she hands over her ownership share to Regan. Part owner Stevie and sisters Grace and Regan McLeod (cousins of Jodi, Tess, and Claire McLeod) consequently run Drovers with the assistance of Kate, Moria and Tayler. Then in 2008, the last season, Grace's sister Jaz McLeod (Jasmine) returns with a dark secret and stays on to help sister Grace and, now widow of Alex Ryan, Stevie Hall along with Moira Doyle and Tayler Geddes.

Owners
See Also: List of characters from McLeod's Daughters

Farmhands
See Also: List of characters from McLeod's Daughters

References

McLeod's Daughters
Fictional farms
Fictional populated places in Australia